Six ships in the United States Navy have been named USS Preston for Samuel W. Preston.

  was captured in 1864, commissioned in 1865 and decommissioned later that same year.
  was captured in 1865 and sold in 1868.
  was commissioned in 1909 and decommissioned in 1919.
  was commissioned in 1921 and decommissioned in 1930.
  was commissioned in 1936 and sunk in November 1942.
  was commissioned in 1944 and transferred to Turkey in 1969.

United States Navy ship names